Gailbach is a river of East Tyrol, Austria. It is a right tributary the Drava.

References

Rivers of Tyrol (state)
Rivers of Austria